Bolshebaikovo (Olo Bayıq) is a rural locality (a village) in Bayguzinsky Selsoviet, Ishimbaysky District, Bashkortostan, Russia. The population was 52 as of 2010. There are 2 streets.

Geography 
Bolshebaikovo is located 16 km southeast of Ishimbay (the district's administrative centre) by road. Kyzyl-Yulduz is the nearest rural locality.

References 

Rural localities in Ishimbaysky District